Arvilla (also Orange) is an unincorporated community in central Grand Forks County, North Dakota, United States. It lies along U.S. Route 2, west of the city of Grand Forks, the county seat of Grand Forks County.  Its elevation is 1,004 feet (306 m). The community was first named Orange for Orange County, New York; it was renamed Arvilla for Arvilla Estella Hersey, the wife of a local farmer. Although Arvilla is unincorporated, it has a post office, with the ZIP code of 58214.

Climate
This climatic region is typified by large seasonal temperature differences, with warm to hot (and often humid) summers and cold (sometimes severely cold) winters.  According to the Köppen Climate Classification system, Arvilla has a humid continental climate, abbreviated "Dfb" on climate maps.

References

Unincorporated communities in Grand Forks County, North Dakota
Unincorporated communities in North Dakota